Witkowice may refer to:

Witkowice, Lesser Poland Voivodeship (south Poland)
Witkowice, part of the Prądnik Biały district of Kraków
Witkowice, Łódź Voivodeship (central Poland)
Witkowice, Subcarpathian Voivodeship (south-east Poland)
Witkowice, Masovian Voivodeship (east-central Poland)
Witkowice, Chodzież County in Greater Poland Voivodeship (west-central Poland)
Witkowice, Konin County in Greater Poland Voivodeship (west-central Poland)
Witkowice, Szamotuły County in Greater Poland Voivodeship (west-central Poland)
Witkowice, Silesian Voivodeship (south Poland)